The Revd Canon William Telfer   (16 January 1886 – 13 January 1968) was an English clergyman and academic, who specialised in early Christian studies.  Telfer served as Dean of Clare College, Cambridge (1921), Ely Professor of Divinity at Cambridge University (1944–1947) and Master of Selwyn College, Cambridge (1947–1956).

Telfer was born in Rochester, Kent, the son of a schoolmaster.  Having graduated from Clare College in 1908, he was ordained and became Vicar of All Saints Church, Rotherhithe, which would be destroyed by a bomb in 1944. Telfer returned to his old Cambridge college as a Fellow in 1921.  Following his career at Cambridge, he continued to write on theological subjects in his retirement.

Telfer worked as a chaplain during the First World War, earning the Military Cross in the 1916 Birthday Honours.

Publications

'

References

1886 births
1968 deaths
Fellows of Clare College, Cambridge
Masters of Selwyn College, Cambridge
Recipients of the Military Cross
British Army personnel of World War I
People from Rochester, Kent
Ely Professors of Divinity